Yang Shu (born September 23, 1963) is a Chinese cinematographer, based in Beijing. His work was recognized at the Manaki Brothers International Film Camera Festival, where he was awarded the top prize of the Golden Camera 300 for his work as director of photography on Peacock (2005).

Filmography

As cinematographer

References

External links
 

Chinese cinematographers
1963 births
Living people